Damien Dufour (born October 30, 1981) is a French footballer who plays as a midfielder for AS Prix-lès-Mézières.

Career
Dufour was born in Migennes. He played the 2007–08 season for Grenoble Foot on loan from AJ Auxerre.

References

External links

 

1981 births
Living people
French footballers
Association football forwards
AJ Auxerre players
Grenoble Foot 38 players
LB Châteauroux players
CS Sedan Ardennes players
Ligue 1 players
Ligue 2 players